The Legend of the Book and Sword is a Hong Kong television series adapted from Louis Cha's novel The Book and the Sword. The series was first aired on TVB in Hong Kong in 1987.

Cast
 Note: Some of the characters' names are in Cantonese romanisation.

 Pang Man-kin as Chan Ka-lok / Fuk-hong-on
 Simon Yam as Kin-lung Emperor
 Kitty Lai as Lei Yun-chi
 Jacqueline Law as Fok-ching-tung
 Fiona Leung as Heung-heung
 Lawrence Ng as Yu Yu-tung
 Shek Sau as Man Tai-loi
 Barbara Chan Man-yee as Lok Bing
 Jaime Chik as Yuk-yu-yee
 Liu Kai-chi as Tsui Tin-wang
 Kiki Sheung as Chow Yee
 Ng Man-tat as Chow Chung-ying
 Elliot Ngok as Cheung Chiu-chung
 Lau Kong as Luk Fei-ching
 Chun Wong as Chiu Bun-san
 Dicky Cheung as Sam-yin
 Kwan Ching as Taoist Mou-chan
 Ho Lai-nam as Seung Hak-chi
 So Hon-sang as Seung Pak-chi
 Henry Lee as Wai Chun-wah
 Chu Tit-wo as Yeung Sing-hip
 Cheung Lui as Cheung Chun
 Mak Tsi-wan as Shek Sheung-ying
 Bobby Tsang as Cheung Say-kan
 Felix Lok as Lei Ho-sau
 Tam Chuen-hing as Siu-wai
 Pak Ying as Yu Man-ting
 Kwan Hoi-san as Yuen See-siu
 Kon Kwok-wai as Chan Cheng-tak
 Pak Yan as Kwan Ming-mui
 Yeung Chak-lam as Wong Wai-yeung
 Wu May-yee as Mrs Chow
 Wayne Lai as Mang Kin-hung
 Fok Ka-lai as On Kin-kong
 Bak Man-biu as Muk-cheuk-lun
 Ngai Wai as Fok-ah-yee
 Benz Hui as Ah-fan-tai
 Chan On-ying as Ah-fan-tai's wife
 Tam Bing-man as Master Tong
 Leung Hung-wah as Tung Siu-wo
 Kiu Hung as Koo Kam-biu
 Chun Hung as Ha-hap-toi
 Ma Hing-sang as Kiu Man-kei
 Chu Siu-kei as Yim Sai-fui
 Ko Miu-see as Tsui Chiu-sang
 Lau Siu-ming as Chan Sai-koon
 Chan Yau-how as Tin King
 Yip Tin-hang as Pak Chun
 Seung Yee as Empress Dowager
 Ng Wan-yee as Kin-lung's wet nurse

External links

1987 Hong Kong television series debuts
1987 Hong Kong television series endings
TVB dramas
Hong Kong wuxia television series
Television series set in the Qing dynasty
Works based on The Book and the Sword
Television shows about rebels
Cantonese-language television shows
Works by Susan Chan
Television shows based on works by Jin Yong
Qianlong Emperor